The Thenzawl golf course is a public golf course in a meadow at Thenzawl in Mizoram, India.  The golf course is set at an altitude of 2568 feet. It is owned by the State Government of Mizoram. The course extends over 105 acres and the play space is 75 acres and comprises 18 holes.

History

The golf course was inaugurated by Union minister of state for culture and tourism (independent charge) Prahlad Singh Patel on 4 August 2020. This golf course has been developed under Swadesh Darshan Scheme at the cos tof ₹64.48 crore. The Golf Course has been designed by Graham Cooke and Associates, a Canadian firm. It also has automated sprinkler irrigation system by Rain Bird, USA.

Facilities

Accommodation for golfers is provided by the golf club with an annex with thirty fully furnished log of Siberian pinewoods.

Other Facilities include.

 Convention Centre
 Tourist Reception Center 
 Cafe
 Billiards
 Food Court
 Watch Tower
 Open Air Theater 
 Eco Park

See also
Tourism in Mizoram

References

Sport in Mizoram
Golf clubs and courses in India
Sports venues in Mizoram
Serchhip district
2020 establishments in Mizoram
Sports venues completed in 2020